Douglas Robert Woodall (born November 1943 in Stoke-on-Trent) is a British mathematician and psephologist.  He studied mathematics at the University of Cambridge, and earned his Ph.D. at the University of Nottingham in 1969, his thesis being "Some results in combinatorial mathematics". He worked in the Department of Mathematics from 1969 until his retirement in 2007, as researcher, lecturer, associate professor and reader.  He devised the later-no-harm criterion, a voting system criterion that is considered important in the comparison of electoral systems.  Woodall has done a lot of work exploring the monotonicity criterion. He also contributed to the problem of fair cake-cutting, for example, by presenting an algorithm for finding a super-proportional division.

Selected publications

See also
Woodall's conjecture on dicuts and dijoins in directed graphs

References

External links

1943 births
Living people
Psephologists
Voting theorists
Combinatorialists
British mathematicians
Alumni of the University of Cambridge
Alumni of the University of Nottingham
Academics of the University of Nottingham
People from Stoke-on-Trent
Fair division researchers